Emotional is the debut album by American R&B singer Carl Thomas. It was released by Bad Boy Records and Arista Records on April 18, 2000, in the United States. Emotional earned Thomas a nomination in the Best R&B/Soul Album at the 2001 Soul Train Music Awards, also garnering him a Male & Best R&B/Soul or Rap New Artist nod. "I Wish" was also nominated for Best R&B/Soul Single.

Critical reception

Michael Paoletta from Billboard found that on Emotional the singer "shifts into romantic over-drive on his debut album – and that's a good thing [...] Thomas deservedly takes a giant step to the forefront on this 17-track debut," crafting "his own brand of new-millenium soul while paying homage to the original groove of the '70s and '80s." 
Rolling Stone rated the album three and a half stars out of five and called the album "an unabashedly romantic work, spun on the twin poles of longing and loss [...] laying bare a notable ambition within the ballad genre [...] Thomas proves himself a more than viable heir to the tradition of race-music crooners." It was included in Rolling Stones Top 50 Albums of 2000 listing.

Michael A. Gonzalez, writer for Vibe called Emotional an "exquisite, lush soundtrack that the lovelorn of the world can call their own [...] Thomas endears us with his vulnerability, standing emotionally naked and unpretentious at a time when R&B has lost nearly all of its romance and subtlety." Allmusic editor Heather Phares rated the album two out of five stars. She felt that "though the set features competent singing, songwriting, and production, outside of the singles, it's not a particularly distinctive collection. Thomas' voice is impressive, but he needs better and more varied material to truly shine."

Singles
"Summer Rain" was the album's lead single. The song was a sleeper hit and did not chart on the Billboard Hot 100 until "I Wish" charted. "Summer Rain" ended up peaking at number 80 on the week of October 14, 2000. "I Wish”, was released as the album's second single. It is the album's highest-charting single. "I Wish" peaked at number 20 on the Billboard Hot 100 on the week of May 13, 2000. The album's final single, the title track "Emotional" performed moderately. The single peaked at number 47 on the Billboard Hot 100 on the week of December 30, 2000. “Woke Up in the Morning” was released as a promotional single in 2000. Its remix features the Notorious B.I.G.

Track listing

Notes
  denotes co-producer

Sample credits
 "Emotional" contains samples and interpolations of "Shape of My Heart" by Sting.
 "Giving You All My Love" contains a sample of "Wherever You Are" by Isaac Hayes.
 "Cadillac Rap (Interlude)" contains a sample of "Be My Girl" by the Dramatics.
 "Woke Up in the Morning" contains a sample from "My Downfall" by the Notorious B.I.G.
 "Come to Me" contains a sample from "Let's Stay Together" By Roberta Flack.
 "Summer Rain" contains an interpolation of "Summer Soft" by Stevie Wonder.

Personnel
Credits adapted from the album's liner notes.

Charles "Prince Charles" Alexander – engineer, mixing
Ben H. Allen – engineer
Mark Batson – engineer
Rick Brown – associate executive producer
Tom Cassel – recorder
Gordon Chambers – producer
Roger Che – recorder
Mike City – producer
Sean "Puffy" Combs – executive producer
Dave Dar – assistant engineer
Stephen Dent – engineer
John Eaton – engineer
Datu Faison – associate executive producer
Rasheed Goodlowe – assistant engineer
Terri Haskins – wardrobe design
Heavy D – producer
Ron Lawrence – producer
Ken Huffnagle – assistant engineer
Herb Powers – mastering
Jeff Lane – engineer
Paul Logus – mixing
Kim Lumpkin – project manager
Dominick Mancuso – assistant engineer
Tony Maserati – mixing
Lynn Montrose – assistant engineer
Nigel Parry – photography
Rob Paustain – mixing
Joe "Smilin' Joe" Perrera – engineer
Harve Pierre – A&R, associate executive producer, producer
Kelly Price – background vocalist
Nivea - background vocalist
Marlon Robinson – background vocalist
Ed Raso – engineer
Garrett Blake Melodeus Smith – producer
Carl Thomas – producer
Chucky Thompson – producer
J. Willbanks – assistant engineer
Mario Winans – producer, vocals
Malik Yusef – words

Charts

Weekly charts

Year-end charts

Certifications

References 

2000 debut albums
Carl Thomas (singer) albums
Bad Boy Records albums
LaFace Records albums
Arista Records albums
Albums produced by Sean Combs